Rimondeix (Auvergnat: Rimondés) is a former commune in the Creuse department in the Limousin region in central France. On 1 January 2016, it was merged into the new commune Parsac-Rimondeix.

Geography

Population

Sights
 The church, dating from the twelfth century.

See also
Communes of the Creuse department

References

Former communes of Creuse
Populated places disestablished in 2016